Arnaldo Fabrizio Zanotti (born 21 May 1983) is a Paraguayan professional golfer who plays on the European Tour.

Early life
Zanotti was born in Asunción. He was Paraguay's top ranked amateur golfer for six straight years.

Professional career
Zanotti turned professional in 2003. In 2006 Zanotti won the Tour de las Americas Order of Merit with victory at the final event of the season, the Abierto Mexicano Corona. The tournament was also the second event on the 2007 Challenge Tour schedule, and the win enabled him to join the tour for the remainder of the season. He ended the season in 11th place on the Challenge Tour Rankings to graduate to the top level European Tour for 2008.

In his rookie season on the European Tour, Zanotti finished 153rd on the Order of Merit to lose his place on the tour. However he regained his card for 2009 by finishing 16th at the end of season qualifying school. He has kept his card since, with a best finish of 63rd on the Race to Dubai in 2009.

Zanotti won his first European Tour event at the 2014 BMW International Open. The win made Zanotti the first Paraguayan to win on the European Tour. Also, he finished third at the Madeira Islands Open - Portugal - BPI, fifth at the Lyoness Open, ninth at the Alstom Open de France and tenth at the BMW Masters. In 2015, he finished second at the British Masters, third at the Open d'Italia, fourth at the KLM Open and seventh at the Nordea Masters.

His second European Tour win came at the Maybank Championship in February 2017. He scored a final round 63, including a birdie-eagle finish, to beat David Lipsky by a stroke. Zanotti had begun the final round six shots off the lead, but a birdie on the 71st hole sent him to the top of the leaderboard for the first time all week. The win moved Zanotti back inside the top 100 in the world rankings.

At the 2019 Pan American Games, Zanotti won the gold medal in the men's individual competition and the silver medal in the mixed team competition.

Professional wins (7)

European Tour wins (2)

1Co-sanctioned by the Asian Tour

European Tour playoff record (1–0)

Challenge Tour wins (1)

1Co-sanctioned by the Tour de las Américas

Tour de las Américas wins (2)

1Co-sanctioned by the Challenge Tour
2Co-sanctioned by the TPG Tour

PGA Tour Latinoamérica Developmental Series wins (1)

Other wins (1)

Other playoff record (1–0)

Results in major championships

Results not in chronological order in 2020.

CUT = missed the half-way cut
"T" indicates a tie for a place
NT = No tournament due to the COVID-19 pandemic

Results in World Golf Championships
Results not in chronological order before 2015.

"T" = Tied

Team appearances
Amateur
Eisenhower Trophy (representing Paraguay): 2000, 2002

Professional
World Cup (representing Paraguay): 2007

See also
2007 Challenge Tour graduates
2008 European Tour Qualifying School graduates
2013 European Tour Qualifying School graduates

References

External links

Paraguayan male golfers
European Tour golfers
Olympic golfers of Paraguay
Golfers at the 2016 Summer Olympics
Golfers at the 2020 Summer Olympics
Pan American Games medalists in golf
Pan American Games gold medalists for Paraguay
Pan American Games silver medalists for Paraguay
Golfers at the 2019 Pan American Games
Medalists at the 2019 Pan American Games
Sportspeople from Asunción
Paraguayan people of Italian descent
1983 births
Living people